{{Infobox album
| name       = Seducción
| type       = studio
| artist     = Jennifer Peña
| cover      = Seducción.jpg
| alt        =
| released   = 
| recorded   = 2003-2004
| venue      =
| studio     = Crescent Moon StudiosCuero Room StudiosDB Music Productions StudiosL.M. Recording StudiosLemon Tree StudiosSantander StudiosSouth Beach AudioTCMP Studio (Miami, Florida) The Beach House Recording Studios (Miami Beach, Florida)
| genre      = Latin pop
| length     = 49:06
| label      = Univision Records
| producer   = 
 Jennifer Peña
 Kike Santander
 Rudy Pérez
 Emilio Estefan, Jr.
 Daniel Betancourt
 Manny Lara
 Gaitán Bros.
 José Luis Arroyave
 Tulio Cremisini
 Carlos Infante
 José Behar (Executive producer)
| prev_title = Libre
| prev_year  = 2002
| next_title = Houston Rodeo Live
| next_year  = 2004
| misc       = 
}}

Seducción (English: Seduction) is the sixth studio album recorded by Mexican-American Jennifer Peña, It was released by Univision Music on May 18, 2004 (see 2004 in music). This effort debuted at number one on the Billboard Top Latin Albums chart.

History
This recording reteamed the singer with Rudy Pérez, Kike Santander and offered new production by Emilio Estefan, Jr. "Vivo y Muero En Tu Piel" was selected as the lead single, and peaked at number one in the Hot Latin Tracks charts, her second single to do so. Seducción was released in a traditional CD package format and also as a CD/DVD combo which included the original track listing and a DVD with documentary, music videos and a picture gallery. The album was received well selling over 300,000, being certified multi-platinum by the RIAA. On this production, Jennifer Peña became a contributing producer for the first time on the tracks "Ya Verás" and "Si Yo Me Vuelvo A Enamorar". It was once again executive produced by José Behar, head of Univision Music Group. Heavy promotion followed the album which included stops in Central America, South America and all across the United States and Puerto Rico.

The success of this album led to many nominations for the Billboard Latin Music Award, including: Latin Pop Album of the Year for the album, and Latin Pop Airplay Track of the Year, Tropical Airplay Track of the Year and Regional Mexican Airplay Track of the Year for the first single "Vivo y Muero en Tu Piel". Also Jennifer received the Premio Lo Nuestro for Female Entertainer of the Year.

Track listing 
The information from Billboard

CD

DVD
The information from Allmusic.

Personnel
Adapted from Allmusic.

José Behar – Executive producer
Luz De La Cruz – Executive producer
Emilio Estefan, Jr. – Producer
Carlos Infante – Producer
Manny Lara – Producer
Kike Santander – Producer
Jennifer Peña – Performer, producer
Gaitán Bros. – Programming, producer
Rudy Pérez – Guitar, arranger, producer, vocals, direction
José Luis Arroyave – Arranger, keyboards, programming, producer
Daniel Betancourt – Arranger, keyboards, programming, producer
Tulio Cremisini – Arranger, electric guitar, keyboards, programming, producer
Clay Perry – Arranger, keyboards, programming
Boris Milan – Mixing
Andrés Bermúdez – Engineer
Bruce Weeden – Engineer
Scott Canto – Engineer
Juan Jose Virviescas – Engineer
Alfred Figueroa – Engineer
Joel Numa – Engineer
David López – Assistant engineer
Richie Pérez – Assistant engineer
Daniel Ponce – Assistant engineer
Kevin Dillon – Production coordination
Leyla Leeming – Production Coordination
Betsy Perez – Production Coordination
José Juan Maldonado – Production Coordination
Ángela Duque – Artist coordination
Steve Menezes – Studio Coordinator
Andrés Castro – acoustic guitar, electric guitar
Manny López – Guitar, arranger, keyboards, programming
Richard Bravo – percussion
Julio Hernández – Bass
Sergio Minski – Acoustic guitar, electric guitar, production coordination
Archie Peña – Percussion, drums
Rafael Vergara – vocals
Area 305 – Vocals
Vicky Echeverri – Vocals
Robin Espejo – Vocals
Mario Patiño – Creative director
Adriana Rebold – Graphic design, art direction
Gio Alma – Photography
Vaughn Smith – Video director
Irma Martínez – Stylist

Charts

Sales and certifications

Notes

References

2004 albums
Jennifer Peña albums
Spanish-language albums
Univision Records albums
Albums produced by Kike Santander
Albums produced by Rudy Pérez
Albums produced by Emilio Estefan
Albums recorded at Q-Productions